This list of Grambling State University alumni includes graduates, non-graduate former students and current students of Grambling State University.

Grambling State University is  a historically black (HBCU), public, coeducational university, located in Grambling, Louisiana, United States.

Elijah Grant professional baseball player

News, media and journalism

Education

Entertainment

Criminal justice

Politics

Sports

See also
 Grambling State University alumni

References 

List
Grambling State University alumni